Taekwondo was contested at the 2017 Asian Indoor and Martial Arts Games from 18 September to 22 September 2017. The competition took place at Taekwondo Arena in Ashgabat, Turkmenistan.

Medalists

Poomsae

Men's kyorugi

Women's kyorugi

Medal table

Results

Poomsae

Men's individual
22 September

Men's team
22 September

Women's individual
22 September

Women's team
22 September

Men's kyorugi

54 kg
18 September

58 kg
20 September

63 kg
19 September

68 kg
21 September

74 kg
18 September

80 kg
20 September

87 kg
19 September

Women's kyorugi

46 kg
18 September

49 kg
20 September

53 kg
19 September

57 kg
21 September

62 kg
20 September

67 kg
21 September

73 kg
19 September

References 
 Medalists by events

External links
 Official website
 Results book – Taekwondo

2017 Asian Indoor and Martial Arts Games events
Asian Indoor and Martial Arts Games
2017